Partial general elections were held in Belgium on 8 June 1886. In the elections for the Chamber of Representatives the result was a victory for the Catholic Party, which won 98 of the 138 seats.

Under the alternating system, elections were only held in four out of the nine provinces: Hainaut, Limburg, Liège and East Flanders.

The Catholics continued their gains, after the 1884 elections that gave them a victory over the Liberals. With the defeat of the Liberals by the Catholics in the eight-member arrondissement of Ghent, the Catholics now had all "Flemish" seats. Catholics also gained both seats of the arrondissement of Waremme and two out of seven in the arrondissement of Charleroi.

Results

Chamber of Representatives

References

1880s elections in Belgium
General
Belgium
Belgium